The Auschwitz Combat Group  was international left-wing resistance organization in Auschwitz concentration camp.

History
Kampfgruppe Auschwitz was founded in 1943.  In 1944, together with the Polish Underground State, the Kampfgruppe set up an overall Auschwitz Military Council to coordinate resistance.

Members
The majority of members of the Group were communists, socialists, captured Polish and Soviet partisans, members of anti-Nazi resistance movements, and former members of International Brigades. The members of the Kampfgruppe were from Austria, Poland, France, Germany, Yugoslavia, Czechoslovakia and the Soviet Union. Among them were also many Jews.

Leadership
 Ernst Burger (nom de guerre Adam) - political leader of Kampfgruppe Auschwitz, member of anti-nazi Austrian Resistance.
 Hermann Langbein (nom de guerre Wiktor) 
 Józef Cyrankiewicz (nom de guerre Rot) responsible for cooperation with  resistance groups in another nazi concentration camps
 Tadeusz Hołuj (nom de guerre Robert)  responsible for cooperation with another resistance groups in Auschwitz 
 Heinrich Dürmayer - was appointed after Hermann Langbein
 Ludwig Soswinski - was appointed after Tadeusz Hołuj
 Bruno Baum - was appointed after Ernst Burger

Another notable members
 Alfred Klahr - Austrian communist politician and intellectual
 Karl Lill
 Franz Danimann

See also
 Resistance movement in Auschwitz
 Austrian Resistance
 Polish resistance movement in World War II
 Jewish resistance under Nazi rule

References

External links
 Auschwitz: Ruch Oporu - Zorganizowana konspiracja official website of Auschwitz-Birkenau State Museum

Auschwitz concentration camp
World War II resistance movements
Polish underground organisations during World War II
Austrian resistance
Jewish resistance during the Holocaust
Anti-fascist organizations
Anti-fascist organisations in Poland